Albert Journeay (November 25, 1890 – May 1972) was an American football player.  A native of Piermont, New York, he grew up in Leonia, New Jersey.  He attended the Mt. Hermon School before enrolling at the University of Pennsylvania.  Journeay played at the guard and center positions for Penn's football teams from 1912 to 1914.  At the end of the 1913 season, he was elected by his teammates as the captain of the 1914 football team.  At the end of the 1914 season, he was selected as a first-team All-American by James P. Sinnot of the New York Evening Mail, the Washington Herald, Newark Evening Star, and Philadelphia Inquirer. Journeay graduated from Penn in 1915 with a Bachelor of Arts degree in economics.  After graduating from Penn, Journeay had a career in banking in Chattanooga, Tennessee.

See also
 1914 College Football All-America Team

References

Penn Quakers football players
1890 births
1972 deaths
People from Leonia, New Jersey
People from Piermont, New York
People from Valrico, Florida
American football centers